Twice is a trade publication launched by publisher Richard Ekstract in 1987, currently owned by Future US along with website serves the information needs of retailers, distributors and manufacturing/suppliers in the consumer electronics and major appliance industries. TWICE is an acronym for This Week In Consumer Electronics.

The editor-in-chief was Stephen Smith, until June 2014. He is now Editor at Large. His replacement Editor in Chief was John Laposky. He died on April 11, 2018, and was succeeded by Lisa Johnston, a longtime editor with the publication, until she departed the company in May, 2019. The editorial offices are located in New York City.
 
Established in 1987, TWICE magazine is published twice monthly with an extra issue in January and September. Common topics covered include consumer electronics and major appliance retailing and distribution, custom home installation and networking, home and portable audio and video equipment, digital imaging, portable digital communication devices, small office and home office products and technology, computer technology and accessories.

TWICE.com offers live, continually updated daily breaking news and product coverage, "TWICE on the Scene Video" interviews with industry executives, industry blogs, photo galleries and "By The Numbers" statistical stories and research. Readers can register to receive a daily eNewsletter and Breaking News alerts as they occur.

TWICE produces the Official Show Daily of the International Consumer Electronics Show (CES) in Las Vegas every January.

In May of each year, TWICE releases its Top 100 Consumer Electronics Retailers Report, an exclusive statistical ranking of CE retailers by the previous full year's dollar sales. Subsequent reports on the Top 100 Major Appliance Retailers, Top 25 Car Electronics Retailers and Top 25 PC Retailers follow.

As of June 2008, total BPA audited circulation is 20,001 print subscribers.

In 2008, TWICE.com had more 4.5 million page views.

In 2009, owner Reed Business Information sold TWICE, Broadcasting & Cable and Multichannel News to NewBay Media.

In 2018, Future acquired NewBay Media.

References

External links
TWICE magazine website

Business magazines published in the United States
Professional and trade magazines
Magazines established in 1986
Magazines published in New York City